Kermia melanoxytum is a species of sea snail, a marine gastropod mollusk in the family Raphitomidae.

Description
The length of the shell varies between 4 mm and 5 mm; its diameter reaches a max of 2 mm.

Distribution
This marine species occurs off the Loyalty Islands; New Caledonia; Vanuatu; the Philippines; Hawaii and South Africa.

References

 Severns, M. (2011). Shells of the Hawaiian Islands - The Sea Shells. Conchbooks, Hackenheim. 564 pp.
 Liu J.Y. [Ruiyu] (ed.). (2008). Checklist of marine biota of China seas. China Science Press. 1267 pp

External links

 Hervier J. (1896 ["1895"]). Descriptions d'espèces nouvelles de l'Archipel Néo-Calédonien. Journal de Conchyliologie. 43(3): 141-152
 MNHN, Paris: Kermia melanoxytum (syntype)
 Moretzsohn, Fabio, and E. Alison Kay. "HAWAIIAN MARINE MOLLUSCS." (1995)
 Tröndlé, J. E. A. N., and Michel Boutet. "Inventory of marine molluscs of French Polynesia." Atoll Research Bulletin (2009)
 Kilburn, R. N. (2009). Genus Kermia (Mollusca: Gastropoda: Conoidea: Conidae: Raphitominae) in South African Waters, with Observations on the Identities of Related Extralimital Species. African Invertebrates. 50(2): 217-236
 

melanoxytum
Gastropods described in 1896